Matthew 11:28 is the 28th verse in the eleventh chapter of the Gospel of Matthew in the New Testament.

Content
In the original Greek according to Westcott-Hort for this verse is:
Δεῦτε πρός με πάντες οἱ κοπιῶντες καὶ πεφορτισμένοι, κἀγὼ ἀναπαύσω ὑμᾶς.  

In the King James Version of the Bible the text reads:
Come unto me, all ye that labour and are heavy laden, and I will give you rest.

The New International Version translates the passage as:
"Come to me, all you who are weary and burdened, and I will give you rest.

Analysis
Here Christ invites everyone to "come" to him, in a spiritual sense. Those who labour (κοπιῶντες) points to those who suffer trouble and are burdened by 1) sins; 2) the law of Moses; 3) the troubles and temptations of this life. Instead of "give you rest," the Syriac has, "I will place you in all quietness."

Commentary from the Church Fathers
Chrysostom: " By what He had said, He brought His disciples to have a desire towards Him, showing them His unspeakable excellence; and now He invites them to Him, saying, Come unto me, all ye that labour and are heavy laden."

Augustine: "Whence do we all thus labour, but that we are mortal men, bearing vessels of clay which cause us much difficulty. But if the vessels of flesh are straitened, the regions of love will be enlarged. To what end then does He say, Come unto me, all ye that labour, but that ye should not labour?"

Hilary of Poitiers: " He calls to Him those that were labouring under the hardships of the Law, and those who are burdened with the sins of this world."

Jerome: " That the burden of sin is heavy the Prophet Zachariah bears witness, saying, that wickedness sitteth upon a talent of lead. (Zech. 5:7.) And the Psalmist fills it up, Thy iniquities are grown heavy upon me. (Ps. 38:4)"

Uses

Music
The King James Version of this verse is cited as texts in the English-language oratorio "Messiah" by George Frideric Handel (HWV 56).

References

External links
Other translations of Matthew 11:28 at BibleHub

011:28